John Cassaday (born 1971) is an American comic book artist, writer, and television director. He is best known for his work on the critically acclaimed Planetary  with writer Warren Ellis, Astonishing X-Men with Joss Whedon, Captain America with John Ney Rieber, and Star Wars with Jason Aaron. 

Both Marvel Comics and DC Comics include many of Cassaday's iconic images in their marketing, and in their art and poster book collections. Marvel Comics-based animated films have made extensive use of his art. He has received multiple Eagle and Eisner Awards and nominations for his work.

Early career
A self-taught illustrator, Cassaday has listed his influences as, among others, NC Wyeth, classic pulp magazine-culture iconography, and popular music.

He first attended film school and directed television news for five years. He spent one summer working a construction job while working on his portfolio.

Cassaday's first published work appeared in 1994–1995 in comics published by independent publishers Boneyard Press and Caliber Comics. 

He showed his portfolio to popular comic book writer and editor Mark Waid at San Diego Comic-Con International 1996. Soon after, Cassaday began receiving job offers from bigger publishers. He quit his construction job and left Texas for New York.

In December 1996 he produced art for Dark Horse Comics' Ghost. Within a year, he was hired to be the regular artist on Homage Comics' Desperadoes.

Comics
In late 1997 Cassay was hired by DC and Marvel as artist on the Teen Titans and Flash annuals, X-Men/Alpha Flight, and Union Jack. His work on X-Men made him one of its most popular artists.

Cassady quickly became an in-demand artist working on many top titles, including Gen¹³, Superman/Batman, The Hulk, and The Avengers.

Cassaday worked on multiple Captain America projects, including an issue of Fallen Son: The Death of Captain America written by Jeph Loeb, "Captain America Lives Again" and "Captain America: The New Deal".

He based his cover art on World War II propaganda posters. The art was popular with fans and critics alike and Marvel released the works in a series of poster art books. He has also created covers for comic books featuring The Phantom, for US publisher Moonstone Books and the European Egmont, as well as covers for Joss Whedon's Firefly spinoff comic Serenity: Those Left Behind, and Guy Ritchie's Gamekeeper. He handled covers and art direction on Dynamite Entertainment's The Lone Ranger comic-book series. Books featuring his art include Wizard's PosterMania!, Women of Marvel Poster Book, Wolverine Poster Book, New Avengers Poster Book, three editions of the Captain America Poster Book, and DC Comics Covergirls.

The English language edition was published as an eight issue comic series I Am Legion by Devil's Due Publishing. In July 2006, Humanoïdes announced a co-production deal with Pierre Spengler for a screen adaptation of the work. At the 2015 Cannes Film Festival, it was announced that the three picture series would be directed by Nacho Cerda with a screenplay by Richard Stanley.

Cassaday has written stories for Hellboy: Weird Tales, Little Nemo: Dream Another Dream, Rocketeer Adventures, X-Men: Alpha Flight, Bela Lugosi: Takes from the Grave, and Union Jack. He also wrote drawing instruction articles for Wizard Magazine'''s Wizard: How to Draw.

John Cassaday appeared in the Captain America 75th Anniversary television special on ABC in 2016. He is also the artist of the upcoming Captain America comics special anniversary issue. Cassaday and Joss Whedon will team up on a new story featuring Sam Wilson.

Cassaday headlined the highly successful 2015 Star Wars revival at Marvel Comics. The book became the #1 selling comic for 2015. According to Forbes magazine, it was the top-selling comic of the last 20 years. It sold approximately one million copies.

Film and television 
 Work 
Cassaday's art appeared in an episode of HBO First Look, a 2003 documentary about the making of the Daredevil film. 

He worked as a concept artist on the film adaptation of Alan Moore and Dave Gibbons' classic graphic novel Watchmen.

In 2009, the Astonishing X-Men animated DVD series was adapted as a motion comic from Cassaday's art for the comic book series written by Joss Whedon. 

Cassaday directed "The Attic", the December 18, 2009, episode of the TV show Dollhouse, which aired as the tenth episode of that series' second season. 

Cassaday's art was used extensively in the Futureal Studio documentary Adventures into Digital Comics (2010). 

Onscreen appearances 
Cassaday himself appeared in a Wizard World-sponsored documentary in 2002. He also appeared in Generation X: The Comic Book History of the X-Men, a 2006 DVD documentary about the X-Men franchise.

As an actor, Cassaday appeared in small roles in the 2012 horror film House on the Hill and ITV Playhouse.

Technique and materials
In addition to penciling and inking his interior comics pages, Cassaday does his cover work in ink and charcoal, and digitally colors most of his covers. He credits the challenges of working on complicated books like Planetary with making him a better artist.

Awards

Wins
2005 Eisner Award for Best Penciller/Inker  for Astonishing X-Men, Planetary, and I Am Legion: The Dancing Faun (tied with illustrator Frank Quitely)
2006 Eisner Award for Best Penciller/Inker for Astonishing X-Men and Planetary2006 Eisner Award for Best Ongoing Series for Astonishing X-Men (with Joss Whedon)
2006 Eagle Award for Favourite Comics Artist: Pencils 
2007 Spike TV Scream Award for Best Comic-Book Artist

Nominations
2000 Eisner Award Best Cover Artist for Planetary2002 Eisner Award Best Penciler/Inker for Planetary2004 Eagle Award Favourite Comics Artist: Pencils 
2007 Eisner Award Best Cover Artist Astonishing X-Men and Lone Ranger2008 Eisner Award for Best Cover Artist Astonishing X-Men and Lone Ranger2010 Eisner Award for Best Cover Artist Irredeemable and Lone RangerBibliography

 Boneyard Press
 Bill the Bull: One Shot, One Bourbon, One Beer #1 ("Justin") (Boneyard Press, 1994)
 Flowers on the Razorwire #5–6 (Boneyard Press, 1995)

 Caliber Comics 
 Negative Burn #28 ("Juju Eyes") (Caliber Comics, 1995)

 CFD Productions 
 No Profit for the Wise #5–6 (CFD Productions, 1996)

Dark HorseGhost #27 (June 1997)Ghost: Black October, Dark Horse, 1999, Hellboy: Weird Tales, miniseries, #1-8 (among other artists) (2003–04)Hellboy Weird Tales volumes 1 and 2, Dark Horse, 2003, 2004, 

DCJust Imagine Stan Lee with John Cassaday creating Crisis (2002)Flash, vol. 2, Annual #10 (1997)I Am Legion: The Dancing Faun (2004)Planetary #1-27 (1999–2009)Planetary, vol. 2, #1-4 (2001–10)Planetary/Batman: Night on Earth (2003)Superman/Batman #26 (among other artists) (2006)Teen Titans Annual #1 (1997)Transmetropolitan: I Hate It Here (among other artists) (2000)Action Comics #1000: Faster Than A Speeding Bullet (2018)

ImageC-23 #6 (1998)Desperadoes: A Moment's Sunlight. miniseries #1–5 (Homage Comics/WildStorm, 1997–1998)
 Desperadoes: A Moment's Sunlight tpb, 104 pages, Homage Comics/WildStorm, 1998, Desperadoes: Epidemic!. One-shot, Homage Comics/WildStorm, 1999 — artwork laid out by Cassady, drawn by John LucasGen13 #33 (1998)

MarvelAstonishing X-Men #1-24, Giant-Sized #1 (2004–2008)Astonishing X-Men Omnibus (2009) Astonishing X-Men by Joss Whedon and John Cassaday Ultimate Collection (2012) Astonishing X-Men Ultimate Collection Book 2(2012) Captain America, #1-6 (2002)Captain America: Marvel Knights Volume I (2016) Captain America: The New Deal (2010) Fallen Son: The Death of Captain America (Iron Man) #5 (2007)Ka-Zar: Flashback #1 (1997)
 Miracleman Variant cover art Issue #1 (March 2014)
Secret War from the Files of Nick Fury (2005)
 Star Wars #1-6 (2015)
Star Wars Volume I: Skywalker Strikes (2015) 
Uncanny Avengers #1-4 (2012-2013)
Uncanny Avengers Omnibus (2015) 
 Uncanny X-Men #352 (1998)
 Union Jack, miniseries, #1-3 (1998–99)
Union Jack, tpb, 96 pages, Marvel, 2002, 
 X-Men/Alpha Flight, miniseries, #1-2 (1998)

Notes

References

John Cassaday on Marvel.com
 Collectors' galleries of Cassaday's original artwork

External links

 John Cassady Commissions at Cityinabag

Interviews
John Cassaday Interview at Comic Book Resources, October 28, 2001
An Interview With John Cassaday at CollectorTimes.com, 2002

1971 births
Living people
American comics artists
Eisner Award winners for Best Penciller/Inker or Penciller/Inker Team
People from Fort Worth, Texas
American television directors
Artists from Texas